Guitar Soli is a compilation album by composer and guitarist Robbie Basho, released on July 19, 1996 by Takoma Records.  It is composed of material from his first three albums, recorded for Takoma in the mid 1960s.

Tracks 1 - 3 and 7 were recorded in 1965 and previously released on Seal of the Blue Lotus/ Guitar Soli (Takoma 1005). 
Tracks 4 - 6, 9 - 11 were recorded February 12 and 19, 1965 and released on The Grail and the Lotus, (Takoma 1007). 
Track 8 was recorded February 9, 1966 and released on Basho Sings, Volume 3, (Takoma 1012).

The tracks of this album were remastered by Joe Tarantino at Fantasy Studios in Berkeley.

Track listing

Personnel
Adapted from the Guitar Soli liner notes.
 Robbie Basho – acoustic guitar, acoustic twelve-string guitar, vocals
 Bill Belmont – production
 Paul Kagan – photography
 Linda Kalin – design
 Joe Tarantino – remastering

Release history

References

External links 
 

1996 compilation albums
Robbie Basho albums
Takoma Records compilation albums